Toad Lake may refer to:

Toad Lake (Minnesota)
Toad Lake (Washington)
Toad Lake Township, Becker County, Minnesota